The 22225/22226 Mumbai CSMT - Solapur Vande Bharat Express is India's 9th Vande Bharat Express train, running across the state of Maharashtra.

Overview 
This train is operated by Indian Railways, connecting Mumbai CSMT, Dadar Ctrl, Kalyan Jn, Pune Jn, Kurduwadi Jn and Solapur. It is currently operated with train numbers 22225/22226 on 6 days a week basis.

Rakes 
It is the seventh 2nd Generation train of Vande Bharat Expresses and will be designed and manufactured by the Integral Coach Factory (ICF) under the leadership of Sudhanshu Mani at Perambur, Chennai under the Make in India initiative.

Coach Composition 
The 22226/22225 Solapur - Mumbai CSMT Vande Bharat Express currently has 14 AC Chair Car and 2 Executive Chair Cars coaches.

The coaches in Aqua color indicate AC Chair Cars and the coaches in Pink color indicate AC Executive Chair Cars.

Service 
The 22225/22226 Mumbai CSMT - Solapur Vande Bharat Express will currently operate 6 days a week, covering a distance of 452 km (281 mi) in a travel time of 6 hrs 30 mins with average speeds of 69 km/hr to 70km/hr. The Maximum Permissible Speed (MPS) given is 110 km/hr.

Schedule 
The schedule of this 22225/22226 Mumbai CSMT- Solapur Vande Bharat Express is given below:-

See also 

 Vande Bharat Express
 Tejas Express
 Gatimaan Express
 Solapur railway station
 Mumbai CSMT Terminus

References 

Vande Bharat Express trains
Named passenger trains of India
Higher-speed rail
Express trains in India
 

Transport in Maharashtra
Transport in Mumbai
Transport in Solapur